412th may refer to:

412th Bombardment Squadron or 912th Air Refueling Squadron (912 ARS), full-time active duty Regular Air Force squadron in California
412th Engineer Command (United States) (TEC), US Army Reserve unit, conducts theater-level engineer operations for Eighth U.S. Army, Korea
412th Fighter Squadron or 197th Air Refueling Squadron, flies the KC-135R Stratotanker
412th Flight Test Squadron (412 FLTS), part of the 412th Test Wing based at Edwards Air Force Base, California
412th Test Wing, wing of the United States Air Force, assigned to the Air Force Test Center at Edwards Air Force Base, California

See also
412 (number)
412, the year 412 (CDXII) of the Julian calendar
412 BC